Distributed Language Translation (DLT) was a project to develop an interlingual machine translation system for twelve European languages. It ran between 1985 and 1990.

The distinctive feature of DLT was the use of [a version of] Esperanto as an intermediate language (IL) and the idea that translation could be divided into two stages: from L1 into IL and then from IL into L2. The intermediate translation could be transmitted over a network to any number of workstations which would take care of the translation from IL into the desired language. Since the IL format would have been disambiguated at the source, it could itself serve as a source for further translation without human intervention. — Job M. van Zuijlen (one of the DLT researchers)

DLT was undertaken by the Dutch software house BSO (now part of Atos Origin) in Utrecht in cooperation with the now defunct Dutch airplane manufacturer Fokker and the Universal Esperanto Association.

The project's results were far from the expected. From a modern view, the DLT concept was erroneous in itself since it was unable to distinguish the different meanings of the same word in different contexts. Modern statistic-based and context-based translation programs are able to produce a better translation.

See also
Indigenous Dialogues

External links 
 Examples of DLT

References

Translation
Machine translation
Esperanto organizations
Controlled natural languages
1985 establishments in the Netherlands
Projects established in 1985
1985 software
1990 disestablishments in the Netherlands
Products and services discontinued in 1990